The 2011–12 season was the 43rd campaign of the Scottish Men's National League, the national basketball league of Scotland. The season featured 10 teams. East Lothian Peregrines dropped out of the league and were replaced by Boroughmuir Blaze, who rejoined the league. City of Edinburgh Kings won their 9th league title.

Teams

The line-up for the 2011-2012 season features the following teams:
Boroughmuir Blaze
City of Edinburgh Kings
Clark Eriksson Fury
Dunfermline Reign
Glasgow Rocks II
Glasgow Storm
Glasgow University
St Mirren Reid Kerr College
Stirling Knights
Troon Tornadoes

League table

Playoffs

Quarter-finals

Semi-finals

Final

References

Scottish Basketball League 2011-12 - WebArchive

Scottish Basketball Championship Men seasons
Scot
Scot
basketball
basketball